Comatricha is a genus of slime molds in the family Amaurochaetaceae. As of 2015, Index Fungorum includes 39 species in the genus.

Species

Comatricha afroalpina
Comatricha aggregata
Comatricha alta
Comatricha anomala
Comatricha brachypus
Comatricha calderaensis
Comatricha ellae
Comatricha filamentosa
Comatricha fragilis
Comatricha fusiformis
Comatricha kowalskii
Comatricha laxa
Comatricha laxifila
Comatricha longipila
Comatricha meandrispora
Comatricha mirabilis
Comatricha nigra
Comatricha nivalis
Comatricha nodulifera
Comatricha nutans
Comatricha orthotricha
Comatricha parvispora
Comatricha pellucida
Comatricha pseudoalpina
Comatricha pseudonigra
Comatricha pulchella
Comatricha pulchelloides
Comatricha reticulospora
Comatricha retispora
Comatricha rigidireta
Comatricha robusta
Comatricha rutilipedata
Comatricha sinuatocolumellata
Comatricha subalpina
Comatricha suksdorfii
Comatricha tenerrima
Comatricha variabilis
Comatricha vineatilis

 Names brought to synonymy
 Comatricha elegans (Racib.) Lister 1909 is a synonym of Collaria elegans.

References 

Myxogastria
Amoebozoa genera